Njan Ninne Premikkunnu is a 1975 Indian Malayalam-language film, directed by K. S. Gopalakrishnan. The film stars Kamal Haasan, Sudheer, Girija, Janardhanan and Murali Sr. The film has musical score by M. S. Baburaj. The film dubbed Tamil language as Muradan.

Cast 
 Kamal Haasan as Suresh
 Ushakumari (Vennira Aadai Nirmala) as Gracy
 Sudheer
 Girija
 Janardhanan as John
 Murali

Production 
Njan Ninne Premikkunnu film produced by Vishnu and Vazhunnavar under production banner Devi Prabha Arts. It was given an "U" (Unrestricted) certificate by the Central Board of Film Certification.

Soundtrack 
The music was composed by M. S. Baburaj with lyrics by P. Bhaskaran and Bichu Thirumala.

References

External links 
 

1970s Malayalam-language films
Films directed by K. S. Gopalakrishnan